Odlanier Solís Fonte (born 5 April 1980) is a Cuban professional boxer. He has challenged once for the WBC heavyweight title in 2011, and is a former top-rated contender in that division. As an amateur heavyweight, Solis was one of the most celebrated and decorated amateur stars of the 2000s, winning a gold medal at the 2004 Olympics, and three consecutive golds at the World Championships in 2001, 2003, and 2005. Odlanier Solís beat Luis Ortiz (Cuban boxer) multiple times in the amateurs, never losing to him.

Amateur career
His first international success was in 1998, winning the title at the Pan American Juniors championship in Toluca and the Juniors World championship in Buenos Aires.

In 1999 he won the Cuban championship beating Félix Savón. Until 2004 he defended his title five times consecutively.

In 2005 he switched from heavyweight to super heavyweight and lost in the finale to Michel López Núñez. In 2006 he won the title again for a seventh time.

He was part of the Cuban team that won the 2006 Boxing World Cup.

His record was 227 victories, 14 losses. He never lost at a major event (world championships, Olympics) and beat fellow Cuban Félix Savón in two of their three fights. One of those fights was in the Cuban Olympic boxing trial finals in 2000, and the win normally would have allowed Solis to fight in Sydney. Savon, however, was the two-time defending Olympic champion and a gold medal would have equaled the record that László Papp of Hungary and countryman Teófilo Stevenson set with three consecutive boxing gold medals. Thus, Savon was given the spot over Solis, who did not participate in the Olympics at all.

World Championships
Solís became world champion in 2001 in Belfast and in 2003 in Bangkok at heavyweight (201 lbs/91 kg limit), in 2005 in Mianyang at super heavyweight.

In 2001 he beat Russian Olympic silver medalist of 2000 Sultan Ibragimov in the semifinals on points and in the final British David Haye by TKO. Haye gave Solis a standing eight count in the first round and was up by 7 points, but Solis came back strong, turned the score around in the second round and won the fight by stoppage in the third. At the time of stoppage, score was 31–17 in favour of Solis.

In 2003 he won on points in the final against Russian archrival Aleksandr Alekseyev who would win the next world championship. Also, Solis defeated Sultan Ibragimov once more (13-7) in four rounds in the XXXIII Chemistry Cup in Halle, Germany, on March 10, 2002.

Olympic Games
Solis earned a spot on the Cuban Olympic boxing team for the 2004 Summer Olympics in Athens and succeeded the three-time champion Savon as the heavyweight gold medalist.

Amateur highlights

Olympic Games
 2004 in Athens, Greece (heavyweight)
 Defeated Aleksandr Alekseyev (Russia) 24–21
 Defeated Wilmer Vasquez (Venezuela) 24–4
 Defeated Naser Al Shami (Syria) RSC–3 (1:29)
 Defeated Viktar Zuyev (Belarus) 22–13

World Cup
 2005 in Moscow, Russia (heavyweight)
Defeated Ilgar Mamedov (Azerbaijan) RSC–2
Defeated Georgel Gavril (Romania) RSC–3
Defeated Mukhtarkhan Dildabekov (Kazakhstan) 27–20
Lost to Islam Timurziev (Russia) 26–27

Pan American Games
 1999 in Winnipeg, Canada (heavyweight)
Defeated Angus Lewis (Virgin Island) walk-over
Defeated Livin Castillo (Ecuador) 14–2
Defeated Marcelino Novaes (Brazil) 13–2
Defeated Mark Simmons (Canada) 4–2
 2003 in Winnipeg, Canada (heavyweight)
Defeated Gerardo Bisbal (Puerto Rico) RSCH-2
Defeated Jason Douglas (Canada) 16–2
Defeated Kertson Manswell (Trinidad & Tobago) 15–3

World Junior Championships
 1998 in Buenos Aires, Argentina (heavyweight)
Defeated Steffen Kretschmann (Germany) 8–1
Defeated Evgeniy Arkhipov (Russia) 8–2
Defeated Sebastian Ceballos (Argentina) 7–5

Others
 Three times World Senior Champion (2001, 2003, 2005)
 Six time Cuban National Champion (1999–2004)
Chemiepokal – 2002, 2003, 2004
Central American and Caribbean Championships – 1999
Pan American Boxing Championships – 2005

Notable defeated fighters
Cubans: Felix Savón (2 wins, 1 loss), Robert Alfonso 3 wins, Michel López Núñez (3 wins, 3 losses), Osmay Acosta (RSC), Yoan Pablo Hernández (2 wins) TKO & 10-1.
Non-Cubans: Islam Timurziev (1 win, 1 loss), Roman Romanchuk (1 win, 2 losses), Vyacheslav Glazkov (1 win), Kubrat Pulev (2 wins, 1 loss), Sultan Ibragimov (2 wins), David Haye (1 win).

Solís finished his amateur career with a record of 227 wins, 14 losses.

Defection
He defected from the national Cuban boxing team in December 2006, during training in Venezuela for the Pan-American Games in Rio de Janeiro. With him, came two fellow amateurs and reigning Olympic champions, Yan Barthelemí Varela and Yuriorkis Gamboa Toledano. After escaping to Colombia, they arrived in Miami. Solís, who plans to reside in Germany, signed a professional promotional contract with German-based First Artist.

Professional career

Solís made his professional debut on 27 April 2007, weighing in at a much higher weight at 250+ lbs than as an amateur (where he weighed at a solid 200 lbs) but knocked out 32–7 veteran Andreas Sidon 47 seconds into the first round. In the next 18 months he racked up an 11–0 record against creditable opposition at this stage of a professional career, and in October 2008 he defeated Chauncy Welliver for the WBC international heavyweight title.

Solís vs. Barrett
Solis fighting out of Miami, Florida, made his third successful defense of the WBC International Heavyweight title with a second round stoppage of Monte Barrett of Queens, New York. Solis, now 15–0 with 11 KOs, a Cuban defector with an extensive amateur career, fought a very cautious first as a careful counterpuncher, preferring to feel out the experienced Barrett, age 38, 34–8, 20 KOs, to see if he had anything left. In the second, Solis opened up with a long left to Barrett's chin that decked him. Barrett just beat the count. In the barrage from Solis that followed, Barrett went down from a slip under pressure, got up, then got knocked out.

Solís vs. Drumond
On 20 March 2010, Solis fought and defeated Carl Davis Drumond by fourth-round TKO to retain his WBC International Heavyweight title and to win the WBA Fedelatin Heavyweight title. After toying with Drumond for the first three rounds Solis unleashed a barrage of punches during the last 20 second of round three and would have knocked Drumond down had he not been saved by the ropes, making Drumond not want to come out for the fourth round.

Solís vs. Vitali Klitschko

Solis defeated Ray Austin in a WBC title eliminator when Austin was disqualified in the 10th round. Solis connected with combinations to the head in the 10th, with Austin seemingly out on his feet and repeatedly holding Solis to avoid additional shots. The win set up Solis to fight Vitali Klitschko, becoming the mandatory challenger. On 11 January, it was official confirmed that the fight between Vitali Klitschko and Solís was going to take place in Cologne, Germany, on 19 March 2011. Both fighters promised a victory by knockout.

On 19 March 2011, the two boxers took to the ring in front of a sell-out crowd of over 19,000. In the first round of the fight, after the ten-second warning bell rang, Solis threw a left and right which didn't connect, to Klitschko's chin. Vitali Klitschko returned the favor with a short right to Solis's left temple. What followed has been extensively debated by fans and pundits. Some claim that as he was already falling to the ground, Solis injured his right knee while making an effort to prevent himself from hitting the ground. Others maintain that he simply injured his knee, while backpedalling, and was unable to continue. Some believe he was injured prior to the bout but didn't disclose it for fear of not getting paid. The slow motion shows that he was momentarily stunned by the almost grazing temple punch, and his foot froze to the canvas, whilst his leg and body continued backwards, causing an injury to his ankle. He was not able to continue and the fight was ruled a 1st rd KO.

Post Klitschko comeback

Solis launched a comeback following his rehabilitation from knee surgery and scored four consecutive victories over the next three years including points wins over Konstantin Airich and undefeated prospect Leif Larsen. Problematically though it seemed Solis had lost a certain amount of his punching power and foot speed.

Consecutive losses and decline

In 2015 Solis lost two consecutive bouts to former world title challenger, veteran, Tony Thompson. The first was by a close split decision and the second by TKO as Solis retired in his corner for reasons unknown midway through the bout. Since his losses to Thompson Solis has won two bouts against low level opposition. His current ranking according to boxrec is 42 in the world and there has been no speculation regarding a substantive ring return.

Professional boxing record

References

External links

Amateur record  (archived)
Odlanier Solis Q&A at BoxingInsider

1980 births
Boxers at the 2003 Pan American Games
Boxers at the 2004 Summer Olympics
Super-heavyweight boxers
Heavyweight boxers
Defecting sportspeople of Cuba
Living people
Olympic boxers of Cuba
Olympic gold medalists for Cuba
Olympic medalists in boxing
Boxers from Havana
Medalists at the 2004 Summer Olympics
Cuban male boxers
AIBA World Boxing Championships medalists
Pan American Games gold medalists for Cuba
Pan American Games medalists in boxing
Medalists at the 1999 Pan American Games
Medalists at the 2003 Pan American Games